James Dawkins (1722, Jamaica – 6 September 1757, Jamaica) was a member a British Member of parliament, antiquarian, Jacobite and sugar planter and slave owner in Jamaica.

Early life and education
The Dawkins family settled on Jamaica shortly after its seizure from the Spanish in 1655.
James was the eldest son born to Henry Dawkins I (1698–1744), who was a wealthy sugar planter and slave  owner of Clarendon, Jamaica, and his wife, Elizabeth (1697?–1757), third daughter of Edward Pennant of Clarendon, chief justice of the island and of Elizabeth Moore. His brothers were major slave owner William Dawkins (d. 1753) and Henry Dawkins II.

He went to England for his education, attending John Roysse's free school in Abingdon (now Abingdon School) (then headed by the Tory Thomas Woods) and matriculating at St John's College, Oxford on 7 December 1739. His father died in 1744 bequeathing to James 14,300 acres (and making smaller bequests to the two younger sons William and Henry). His plantations included Parnassus Estate, Dawkins Caymanas, Dawkins Salt Pond Pen, Friendship, Leicesterdfields and Old Plantation.

James graduated DCL in 1749.

Career

He embarked on a continental Grand Tour to Paris then Rome, meeting more Jacobite sympathisers along with the experienced traveller Robert Wood.  On 5 May 1750, Wood, Dawkins, Dawkins' Oxford friend John Bouverie and the Italian draughtsman Giovanni Borra set off from Naples in the Matilda to tour and study the Aegean, the coast of Asia Minor, Egypt, Nazareth, Syria (including the ruins of Palmyra and Baalbek), Tripoli and Cyprus, returning in Naples on 7 June 1751.  Borra, Wood and Dawkins returned to England, where Dawkins funded Wood's publication of as well as that of James Stuart and Nicholas Revett's The Antiquities of Athens (it was on Stuart's suggestion that, in 1755, Dawkins was elected to the Society of Dilettanti).

In May 1753 Dawkins travelled to Berlin to meet Frederick the Great, in an inconclusive attempt to gain his support for a Jacobite conspiracy by William King of Oxford, the earl of Westmorland, and the Prussian ambassador Earl Marischal. The British government issued a warrant for Dawkins's arrest in retaliation, but it was not put into effect when he returned to England in 1754. Once back, he bought an estate in Laverstoke and was elected MP for the open borough of Hindon, he held the position until 1757. He also owned, with his brother Henry, the  Sutton's Plantation in Jamaica.

The anonymous 1756 pamphlet, Reflections physical and moral upon the ... numerous phenomena ... which have happened from the earthquake at Lima, attributed to Dawkins, shows his philosophy to have been opposed to that of Descartes and Isaac Newton. On his death in Jamaica in 1757, unmarried, he was buried in Old Plantation, Clarendon before he and his parents' remains were reburied in St Paul's Church, Chapelton, Jamaica when the family estates were sold in 1922.

See also
 List of Old Abingdonians

References

Sources

1722 births
1757 deaths
Fellows of the Royal Society
British antiquarians
Jamaican people of British descent
English Jacobites
Alumni of St John's College, Oxford
People educated at Abingdon School
Members of the Parliament of Great Britain for English constituencies
British MPs 1754–1761
British slave owners
People from Laverstoke